État 140-101 to 140-370 is a class of 2-8-0 steam locomotive of the Chemins de fer de l'État, and subsequently the Société Nationale des Chemins de fer Français (SNCF).

Design
Their light weight per axle made them capable of hauling both passenger and goods trains on most of the État's network.

Construction
The 340 locomotives were ordered in three series. The first series, 70 locomotives, numbered 140-101 to 140-170 were built in France by 
Schneider et Cie. at Le Creusot, SACM at Belfort, and Fives-Lille. These were built and were put into service in 1913.

The declaration of war in 1914 forced the Chemin de fer de l'État to entrust the construction of the second series of 200 locomotives to Nasmyth, Wilson and Company of Manchester and North British Locomotive Company of Glasgow. Two hundred engines, numbered 140-171 to 140-370, were delivered in 1916 and 1917. These engines were mostly used for hauling freight trains.

The third series of 70 locomotives was ordered by the French rail-mounted heavy artillery (Artillerie Lourde sur Voie Ferrée, ALVF). They were numbered 1 to 70, and half were built by North British Locomotive in 1916, and the other half by Vulcan Foundry between 1919 and 1920. After the war, these 70 locomotives were sold, with the NBL-built locomotives going to the Chemins de fer de l'Est as Est 40.001 to 40.035, and the VF-built locomotives to the Chemins de fer de Paris à Lyon et à la Méditerranée (PLM) as 140.K.1 to 140.K.35.

On the formation of the SNCF in 1938, the Est locomotives became 1-140.C.to 1-140.C.35; the État locomotives became 3-140.C.101 to 3-140.C.370; and the PLM locomotives 5-140.K.1 to 5-140.K.35. After World War II, the locomotives were concentrated in the Eastern Region, and while the ex-État locomotives only needed their region prefix changed from "3" to "1", the ex-PLM locomotives were renumbered to 1-140.C.36 to 1-140.C.70.

Service
The 140.Cs were allocated to all the main État depots, Mézidon, Le Mans, Rennes, Brest, Nantes and Bordeaux, and were used to haul many of the company's express trains; Paris-Le Havre, Paris-Cherbourg, Paris-Granville and on the Chemin de fer de Grande Ceinture.

The 140.Cs, hired out to CFTA, were the last steam locomotives in regular day-to-day commercial use on the French railway network. Their final area of operation was the CFTA Réseau Franche-Comté, whose HQ was at Gray, Haute-Saône. Operations were mainly centred on the line from Gray to Châtillon-sur-Seine and Troyes (in Champagne). After the end of SNCF operated steam in 1974, the 140 Cs became the last operating 'main line' French steam locomotives. 140 C 287 pulled the last ever commercial steam train on French railway metals on 24 September 1975 between Gray and Sainte-Colombe.

Preservation
Four locomotives, 140.C.230, 140.C.231, 140.C.313 and 140.C.314 were, thanks to their general good condition, chosen by the CFTA to form a reserve pool of engines. They received servicing at Le Mans in 1970 and were taken to Chaumont engine shed in February 1971. None of the engines were ever reused and 140.C.230 was the only locomotive of the group of four to be scrapped. 140.C.231 was then taken from Chaumont to Longueville on 22 October 1972. 140.C.231, along with tender 18.C.482 is owned by the AJECTA and is chartered on French railways

Due to their prolonged use on parts of SNCF and on the CFTA, a total of eight engines are preserved :—

140.C.22 (NBL 21544 of 1916)
140.C.27 (NBL 21549 of 1916)
140.C.38 (VF 3237 of 1919) is at Train à vapeur en Limousin
140.C.231 (NBL 21376 of 1916) and tender 18.C.482 are owned by AJECTA, and listed as a Monument historique.
140.C.287 (NBL 21624 of 1917) 
140.C.313 (NBL 21650 of 1917) is plinthed at Reims railway station
140.C.314 (NBL 21651 of 1917) owned by the Chemin de fer touristique du Vermandois (CFVT) and is used on its line.
140.C.344 (NBL 21581 of 1917) is part of Cité du train, Mulhouse

Only one Vulcan-built 140.C was saved (all Nasmyth, Wilson & Co. engines were scrapped) and none of the prewar engines (built in France) survived into preservation.

References

 

140-101
2-8-0 locomotives
Schneider locomotives
SACM locomotives
Fives-Lille locomotives
Nasmyth, Wilson and Company locomotives
NBL locomotives
Vulcan Foundry locomotives
Railway locomotives introduced in 1913
Standard gauge locomotives of France